Michael Cavanaugh (born November 21, 1942) is an American actor. Cavanaugh was born in New York City, and has performed in more than one hundred films since 1976. His television guest-credits include The West Wing, Joe Bash, Starman, Hunter, Monk and 24.

He also served in the United States Navy, enlisting following graduation from high school, serving for three years while stationed in Hawaii.

Film

Television

Web series

References

External links
 

1942 births
American male film actors
American male television actors
Living people
Male actors from New York City